Suomenselkä is a drainage divide in western Finland. Rivers flowing west from Suomenselkä drain to the Gulf of Bothnia and the lakes in the east drain to the Gulf of Finland. Historically, this very sparsely populated region separated Ostrobothnia from the southern and eastern lake regions of Finland. The landscape is marked by moraines, eskers, swamps and forests and is difficult to cultivate or settle in. Because it contains some of the few remaining patches of old-growth forest in southern Finland, it is one of the few remaining habitats for Finnish Forest Reindeer (Rangifer tarandus fennica).

Geography of Finland
Drainage divides